Troy Rugless is an Australian former professional rugby league footballer who played in the 1990s and 2000s, and has coached in the 2000s and 2010s. In 2010, Rugless was coach of La Perouse United RLFC.

References

Living people
Australian rugby league coaches
Australian rugby league players
London Broncos players
Place of birth missing (living people)
Rugby articles needing expert attention
Year of birth missing (living people)